The Danish Missionary Society was a Christian missionary society based in Copenhagen and affiliated to the Evangelical Lutheran Church in Denmark. It was founded on 17 June, 1821 by the Rev. Bone Falck Rønne (1764–1833), who chaired the mission board until his demise in 1833. The organisation sent missionaries to the Danish Gold Coast, Danish West Indies, Danish India, Greenland and other Danish colonies around the world. In 1828, it formed an alliance with the Basel Mission Society of Switzerland to recruit and train missionaries to be sent to the Gold Coast. In January 2000, the Danish Missionary Society merged with the Dansk Santalmission (established in 1867) to become the Danmission, focusing on poverty alleviation, interfaith dialogue and church development in twelve nations across, Africa, the Middle East and Asia.

Notable missionaries
Andreas Riis (1804 in Løgumkloster – 1854 in Naksby) a Danish missionary to the Gold Coast for the Basel Evangelical Missionary Society

References 

Religious organizations established in 1821
Christian missionary societies
Christian organizations established in the 19th century
1821 establishments in Denmark